The Institute for Religious Research (IRR) is an American Christian apologetics and counter-cult organization based in Cedar Springs, Michigan. It declares itself to be a non-denominational, non-profit Christian foundation for the study of religious claims, and was formerly known as Gospel Truths Ministries. IRR is a member of Evangelical Ministries to New Religions and was headed by Luke P. Wilson until his death in 2007. IRR's current staff includes Robert M. Bowman Jr. as executive director.

Concurrent with the release of a film adaptation of Dan Brown's novel The Da Vinci Code, the Baptist Press noted IRR's Ronald V. Huggins and his apologetic analysis of the film.

Controversy and Mormonism
Peggy Fletcher Stack, religion columnist for the Salt Lake Tribune discussed IRR and its documentary critique of the Book of Abraham, a document that devout Mormons believe is a divinely inspired sacred text but critics like the IRR contend has prosaic origins. The IRR's documentary was entitled The Lost Book of Abraham: Investigating a Remarkable Mormon Claim. The University of Utah's student newspaper observed the absence of opportunity for Latter Day Saints to respond in the film. In an article for a journal published by Brigham Young University's Foundation for Ancient Research and Mormon Studies, John Gee considered IRR's publication By His Own Hand Upon Papyrus: A New Look at the Joseph Smith Papyri by Charles M. Larson, also regarding the Book of Abraham to be a "deliberate deception".

Additionally, the Deseret News in Salt Lake City pointed out IRR's criticism of the efforts of Richard Mouw of Fuller Seminary to apologize for the actions of some evangelicals towards Mormons, which he characterizes as divisive and sinful.

References

External links
Official website

Christian countercult organizations
Critics of Mormonism
Evangelical Ministries to New Religions
Latter Day Saint movement in Michigan
Christian charities based in the United States
Organizations based in Grand Rapids, Michigan
Charities based in Michigan